The Taocun–Weihai railway is a passenger and freight railway line between Taocun and Weihai in China.

History
The railway was approved on 1 June 1989 and construction began on 28 November 1990. Trial operation began on 26 March 1995 and the first passenger services were introduced in 1996.

In July 2020, work began on electrifying the line.

Route
The line has the following stations:
Taocun (Lancun–Yantai railway)
Rushan
Wendeng
Weihai (Qingdao–Rongcheng intercity railway)

Since its opening in 2014, it has been significantly quicker to use the Qingdao–Rongcheng intercity railway to reach Weihai. However, it does not serve Rushan and instead passes through Yantai. The currently under construction Laixi–Rongcheng high-speed railway will include a station, Rushan South, which will be closer to the city than the existing Rushan station.

Incidents
On 25 July 2011, heavy rainfall led to landslides which damaged the line. While it was being repaired, trains terminated at Rushan and a rail replacement bus service took passengers to Wendeng and Weihai. The line was reopened on 31 July.

References

Railway lines in China